Pierre-Yves Collombat (born 18 July 1945) is a member of the Senate of France.  He represents the Var department, and is a member of the Socialist Party.

References
Page on the Senate website

1945 births
Living people
French Senators of the Fifth Republic
Politicians from Provence-Alpes-Côte d'Azur
Socialist Party (France) politicians
Senators of Var (department)